Aleksandr Kulbako (born 7 June 1990) is a Belarusian former footballer.

External links

Profile at FC Minsk website

1990 births
Living people
Belarusian footballers
FC Partizan Minsk players
FC Minsk players
FC Smolevichi players
Association football midfielders